The term Finnish-Swedish could refer to:
 The Swedish-speaking population of Finland, see Swedish-speaking Finns
 The dialect of the Swedish language spoken by them, see Finland Swedish
 Anything binational that involves both Finland and Sweden, see :Category:Finland–Sweden relations

See also

Notes